Detroit Line may refer to the following rail lines:
Detroit Line (Conrail) in and near Detroit
Detroit Line (Norfolk Southern), Detroit to Toledo
Chicago–Detroit Line, a name for Amtrak's Michigan Line, which runs from Porter, Indiana, to Dearborn, Michigan